John Douglas Torode  (born 23 July 1965) is an Australian-British celebrity chef and TV presenter.  He moved to the UK in the 1990s and began working at Conran Group's restaurants. After first appearing on television on ITV's This Morning, he started presenting a revamped MasterChef on BBC One in 2005. He is a restaurateur; former owner of the Luxe and a second restaurant, Smiths of Smithfield. He has also written a number of cookbooks, including writing some with fellow MasterChef presenter and judge, Gregg Wallace.

Early life 
John Douglas Torode was born on 23 July 1965 as the youngest of three boys in Melbourne, Victoria, but between the ages of four (when his mother died) and then he lived in Maitland, New South Wales, with his brother Andrew, and his grandmother who taught him to cook. He then lived in Edithvale, Melbourne, with his father and his brothers, though his father was frequently away from home because of work.

His early cooking career started at Le Coq Au Vin restaurant in Aspendale and his later apprenticeship was at several establishments in Beaumauris, both in Melbourne. He has said that the food in his childhood was fairly normal, and roast chicken remains one of his favourite dishes because of the connection to his childhood, although his favourite meal at that time was crumbed lamb cutlets.

Career 

He began his cooking career at the age of 16, after leaving school to attend catering college. He moved to the United Kingdom in 1991. A year later he began working at Le Pont de la Tour and Quaglino's as a sous chef for the Conran Group under Terence Conran. While working at Quaglino's, Torode first met Gregg Wallace, whose company supplied the vegetables for the restaurant.

He cooked on ITV's This Morning in 1996, and continued in that role until 2000. In 1998, his cookbook The Mezzo Cookbook won the James Beard Foundation Award for "Best Food Photography". He opened his former restaurant in Smithfield, London in 2000, called Smiths of Smithfield. After a year, he opened a second restaurant, called Cafeteria, near Notting Hill Gate. Its closure made way for larger projects.

Torode has presented a show for the Good Food channel in the UK alongside former Celebrity MasterChef contestant Hardeep Singh Kohli, called New British Kitchen. The show aimed to feature the impact of imported cuisines in Britain. Other television work has included an appearance on the BBC's The Magicians, which saw Torode and Wallace participate in a stunt by magicians Barry and Stuart which hung the pair off the side of the Tate Modern in London. 

He presented the 2014 series John Torode's Australia; the 10 episodes retrace the flavours of John Torode's childhood and the people that inspired his passion for food as he travels the country to go back in time. It has been hosted on BBC Good Food and has so far had three reruns. John Torode's Australia was also recorded as having the largest viewing figures on BBC Good Food in 2014. In 2015, he presented John Torode's Argentina as part of the BBC Two series A Cook Abroad, looking specifically at the country's production, cooking and consumption of beef. The episode explored the history and culture behind Argentina's great beef production and included Torode joining a group of gauchos on a working livestock ranch, before ending at a restaurant in Mendoza where cooking beef is regarded as being an art form.

Torode was featured on BBC News as one of the people behind the project 'Come..Eat Together!' The project encourages the elderly to get together in the community and enjoy food together, encouraging a better social existence and an air of security in their lives.

Torode's 2016 show, John Torode's Malaysian Adventure, aired on the Good Food channel throughout the early part of 2016. The 10-part series, filmed throughout Malaysia and the UK, and was commissioned as a result of the success of John Torode's Australia. In the programme, Torode explores the vibrant and varied cuisine of Malaysia, and travels throughout the country from the capital Kuala Lumpur to Langkawi Island off the northern coast. He cooks with local chefs, meets celebrity restaurateurs, visits night markets and explores the impact of history and culture on the evolution of Malaysian food.

The Korean Food Tour (2017, Good Food Channel) sees Torode travel around South Korea, to the mountains, the cities, the countryside and the coast and work his way through some of the nation's top 100 dishes then creating his own version of Korean classics with a modern twist.

Torode's recent food tours led to his 2017/2018 culinary adventure John Torode's Asia. This recently premiered on the Good Food channel, achieving the highest viewing figures for the channel since March 2013. Commissioned by Good Food's Luke Hale and UKTV's Sally Quick, the series is funded in partnership with a number of organisations including the Hong Kong Tourism Board.
In each location, Torode looks for the most inspiring cooks, discovering the distinctive flavours of their country's cuisine. Cooking on location with local chefs, each episode sees several dishes created, popular and typical of their region. This includes eating in an underwater restaurant, discovering a street food market on the banks of the Yangtze River and making traditional dumplings with a Beijing family, ultimately inspiring the viewer to bring the cuisine of Asia into cooking.

In 2018, John Torode's Middle East (10 x 30 minutes) produced by Blink Films, featured the chef as he travelled across the region to find delicious eats.

In March 2019, Torode, along with actress and food writer Lisa Faulkner, was given his own weekend cooking show. They host John And Lisa's Weekend Kitchen on Sunday mornings on ITV.

John Torode has signed on for two years as ambassador of The Kimberley through APT, one of Australia’s leading companies in the tourism industry. Torode said: “The Kimberley was a region I was aware of but even as an Aussie I hadn’t considered it as a holiday destination. Coming on board as APT’s ambassador and visiting for the first time this year, just wow – it blew me away.”

On 21 July 2022, John Torode's Ireland premiered on Food Network, the six-part series sees the chef discovering Ireland's varied cuisine.

MasterChef 
In 2005, the BBC television show MasterChef was relaunched with an updated format and with Torode and Wallace as presenters replacing Gary Rhodes. Torode was chosen instead of food critic AA Gill. By 2011, the show had been sold to 25 countries. Torode has said in interviews that he enjoys that the show is unscripted and that the cameras are just there to capture the genuine interactions between the judges and the contestants. The show subsequently spawned a spin-off, also hosted by Torode and Wallace, called Celebrity MasterChef. In October 2009, Torode opened a restaurant in Spitalfields market, Commercial street, London, called The Luxe. He sold his shares and moved on from the two restaurants, but under his leadership, turnover at the Luxe and Smiths of Smithfield reached £9.2 million.

He has also co-presented Junior MasterChef, initially along with Nadia Sawalha, the former winner of Celebrity MasterChef, and more recently alongside Donal Skehan.

Guest appearances 
Torode has been a guest several times on BBC One's The One Show, Alan Carr: Chatty Man and The Graham Norton Show, and on ITV's Loose Women and This Morning. On 23 July 2014 (as a keen cyclist) Torode was a guest on ITV4's The Cycle Show.

Personal life 

Torode has four children. He was married to Jessica, in 2000, the mother of his son and daughter but was divorced in 2014 after separating in 2011. He also has two other children from previous relationships.

Torode has been in a relationship with actress and Celebrity Masterchef winner Lisa Faulkner since 2015. The couple married on 24 October 2019 at Aynhoe Park, Oxfordshire.

Torode was appointed Member of the Order of the British Empire (MBE) in the 2022 Birthday Honours for services to food and charity.

Criticism
During a 2018 series of MasterChef, Torode received significant criticism from Malaysian, Indonesian and Singaporean people when Malaysian contestant Zaleha Kadir Olpin was eliminated. Although John correctly commented that the meat should be “falling off the bone”, Gregg Wallace had commented that her contesting rendang dish served with nasi lemak "wasn't crispy enough".

"I like the rendang flavour, there's a coconut sweetness. However, the chicken skin isn't crispy. It can't be eaten and all the sauce is on the skin so I can't eat it," quoted co-judge Gregg Wallace during his judging of the dish, with Torode commenting that the dish was 'not really flavoursome'. Many responded to inform Gregg Wallace that rendang, which is a spicy stew normally made with chicken or beef of tender texture, doesn't consist of crispy outer skin. Subsequently, viewers took to Facebook and Twitter to comment about the rendang's actual texture and how the judges were at fault for eliminating the contestant, when the actual reason was based on Torode's professionalism of flavour enhancements, not Wallace's inexperience of how the dish should be cooked; hence Wallace's reference to a lack of 'crispy skin'   including former Malaysian Prime Minister Najib Razak who posted a picture of the dish on Instagram with the attached caption, "Who eats ‘crispy’ chicken rendang?" Torode responded to the criticism through Twitter by writing: "Maybe Rendang is Indonesian! Love this! Brilliant how excited you are all getting. Namaste", which resulted in further backlash.

Published works 
 
 
 
 
 
 
 
 
 
 
Torode, John (2019) Sydney To Seoul. London: Headline Publishing Group.

References

External links 
 
 
 

Living people
Australian food industry businesspeople
Australian television chefs
Australian television presenters
Australian emigrants to England
Australian expatriates in England
Television personalities from Melbourne
1965 births
Members of the Order of the British Empire